Implement may refer to:

 Implements (Java), an abstract type used to specify an interface in Java programming language
 Implementation, the process for putting a design, plan or policy into effect
 Tool, any physical item that can be used to achieve a goal
Farm implement, machinery used in agriculture
Kitchen implement, utensils used in preparing or eating food
Writing implement, a tool used to produce writing

See also
 Implements of Hell, an album by the Belgian aggrotech act Suicide Commando
 Implementer (disambiguation)